"Team Enstone" is the colloquial name for a British organisation which has operated various different Formula One constructors during its history; its name comes from the village of Enstone in Oxfordshire, where it has been based since late-1991, having previously operated out of Witney. The team's factory is called the Whiteways Technical Centre, and is one of several Formula One team bases located in relatively close proximity to the Silverstone Circuit in Northamptonshire. As of the 2023 Saudi Arabian Grand Prix, forty-five drivers have competed for the five different constructors in the lineage in 736 , winning fifty of them. The outfit has been noted for its frequent changes of identity. Benetton Formula won the 1995 Formula One World Constuctors' Championship and the Renault F1 Team won the 2005 and 2006 Formula One World Constructors' Championship while being operated by the organisation. Although the organisation has changed names and operated different constructors in Formula One, it has legally remained the same company since the 1980s.

The original constructor in the lineage was Toleman, which competed in other categories of motor racing during the 1970s, initially operating out of a workshop in Kidlington and moving into the Witney factory ahead of the 1980 European Formula Two Championship, before entering Formula One starting from the 1981 Formula One World Championship. Toleman was sponsored by the Benetton Group fashion brand before being purchased by the company ahead of the 1986 Formula One World Championship; the organisation was rebranded into a new constructor called Benetton Formula. Although officially a different constructor, Benetton was still effectively the same team as Toleman. Benetton initially continued to race under a British licence, before switching to an Italian licence for the 1996 Formula One World Championship. French car-maker Renault purchased the outfit in March 2000 and renamed it to the Renault F1 Team for the 2002 Formula One World Championship. Renault sold a seventy-five percent stake in the organisation to Genii Capital ahead of the 2010 Formula One World Championship, before selling the remaining twenty-five percent to Genii a year later, with Lotus Cars becoming the Renault team's title sponsor for the 2011 Formula One World Championship. While the team switched from a French to a British licence, they continued to officially compete as Renault in 2011. From the 2012 Formula One World Championship the team represented a new constructor called Lotus F1, whose cars chassis designations contained an "E" which stood for "Enstone". Renault repurchased the team from Genii at the end of the 2015 Formula One World Championship, and the Renault F1 Team name returned for the 2016 Formula One World Championship. For the 2021 Formula One World Championship, Renault renamed the team after their subsidiary marque Automobiles Alpine to the Alpine F1 Team.

Formula One constructors lineage 
 Toleman — based in Witney; competed from the 1981 season to the 1985 season.
 Benetton — competed from the 1986 season to the 2001 season; based in Witney until the end of the 1991 season before moving to Enstone ahead of the 1992 season.
 Renault — French car manufacturer Renault's Formula One operation was based out of Enstone for two stints, the first lasting from the 2002 season to the 2011 season, and the second from the 2016 season to the 2020 season.
 Lotus — operated from the 2012 season to the 2015 season, with Lotus Cars having been Renault's title sponsor during the 2011 season.
 Alpine — a constructor named after Renault's subsidiary brand Automobiles Alpine has been operated by the Enstone organisation since the 2021 season.

Notes

References 

Nicknames in sports
Formula One